Roger Llewellyn († 17 April 2018) was a British actor. He played Sherlock Holmes in 1997, 2007 and 2008 in stage versions of The Hound of the Baskervilles, Sherlock Holmes The Last Act and The Death and Life of Sherlock Holmes.

In 2009 he played Sherlock Holmes again in the Big Finish Sherlock Holmes audio series in the stories The Last Act and The Death and Life.

References

External links

English male television actors
Living people
Year of birth missing (living people)